Gracilibacteria is a bacterial candidate phylum formerly known as GN02, BD1-5, or SN-2. It is part of the Candidate Phyla Radiation and the Patescibacteria group.

The first representative of the Gracilibacteria phylum was reported in 1999 after being recovered from a deep-sea sediment sample. The representative 16S rRNA sequence was referred to as "BD1-5" (sample BD1, sequence 5) and while it was noted that it displayed low sequence identity to any known 16S rRNA gene, it was not proposed as a new phylum at this time. In 2006, representatives of Gracilibacteria were recovered from a hypersaline microbial mat from Guerrero Negro, Baja California Sur, Mexico and proposed as a new phylum "GN02". The BD1-5/GN02 phylum was renamed "Gracilibacteria" in 2013.

The first Gracilibacteria genome was recovered from an acetate-amended aquifer (Rifle, CO, USA) using culture-independent, genome-resolved metagenomic techniques in 2012. Genomic analyses suggest that members of the Gracilibacteria phylum have limited metabolisms and are likely symbionts or endosymbionts. Members of Gracilibacteria use an alternative genetic code in which UGA encodes the glycine amino acid instead of a stop codon

References 

Candidatus taxa
Bacteria phyla